Bekele Haile (born 1927) was an Ethiopian sprinter. He competed in the men's 4 × 100 metres relay at the 1956 Summer Olympics.

References

External links
 

1927 births
Possibly living people
Athletes (track and field) at the 1956 Summer Olympics
Ethiopian male sprinters
Olympic athletes of Ethiopia
Place of birth missing
20th-century Ethiopian people